Live in Malaysia 2004 is a live album by the American rock band Incubus, released in 2004. The album's proceeds go to the band's charitable arm, the Make Yourself Foundation. The concert was held at Bukit Kiara Equestarian Park in Kuala Lumpur on March 16, 2004 in front of a crowd of 8,000. Notable songs in the setlist are "Pantomime", and the "Everything In Ebb" Jam in the middle of Vitamin.

Track listing
Disc one
 "Megalomaniac"
 "A Crow Left of the Murder"
 "Warning"
 "Consequence"
 "Idiot Box"
 "Just a Phase"
 "Priceless"
 "Wish You Were Here"
 "Pantomime"
 "Here In My Room"
Disc two
 "Pistola"
 "Circles"
 "Vitamin"
 "Clean"
 "Talk Shows on Mute"
 "A Certain Shade of Green"
 "Sick Sad Little World"
 "Bass Solo"
 "Are You In?"

Song Origins
Disc One

Tracks 1, 2, 7 and 10 are from A Crow Left of the Murder...
Tracks 3, 6 and 8 are from Morning View
Track 4 is from Make Yourself
Track 5 is from S.C.I.E.N.C.E.
Track 9 is a new song

Disc Two

Tracks 1, 5 and 7 are from A Crow Left of the Murder...
Tracks 2 and 9 are from Morning View
Tracks 3 and 6 are from S.C.I.E.N.C.E.
Track 4 is from Make Yourself
Track 8 is exclusive to the album

Credits

Incubus
Brandon Boyd – vocals
Mike Einziger – guitar
Ben Kenney – bass
Chris Kilmore – turntables, keyboards, mellotron, marxophone
José Pasillas – drums, percussion

Incubus (band) albums
2004 live albums